Dolores Isabel Jacome Silva (born 7 August 1991) is a Portuguese international football player. She plays as a midfielder for Braga and the Portugal women's national team.

Club career
Silva joined 1º Dezembro at 16–years–old and won the League four times in succession, as well as the Cup. In summer 2011, aged 19, she signed for German club FCR 2001 Duisburg and described the move as a "dream".

In August 2011 Silva was unfortunate to suffer an ACL injury in a friendly match against Paris Saint-Germain.

In 2014, FCR 2001 Duisburg folded and was absorbed by MSV Duisburg, Silva was one of the many players who then moved from FCR to MSV. In 2015, she signed with USV Jena.

International career
In June 2011, when transferring to Duisburg, Silva had collected 19 caps for Portugal. This was in addition to 21 appearances at Under–19 level.

Silva hit two goals in Portugal's August 2010 3–0 World Cup qualifying win in Armenia.

International goals

Honours 

S.U. 1º de Dezembro
 Portuguese National Football Championship: Winner 2008, 2009, 2010, 2011
 Portuguese Cup: Winner 2008, 2010, 2011

References

External links

Silva profile on UEFA.com

1991 births
Living people
People from Queluz, Portugal
Portuguese women's footballers
Portugal women's international footballers
Expatriate women's footballers in Germany
FCR 2001 Duisburg players
MSV Duisburg (women) players
FF USV Jena players
Portuguese expatriate sportspeople in Germany
Frauen-Bundesliga players
Women's association football midfielders
Primera División (women) players
Atlético Madrid Femenino players
Portuguese expatriate sportspeople in Spain
Expatriate women's footballers in Spain
Campeonato Nacional de Futebol Feminino players
S.U. 1º Dezembro (women) players
FIFA Century Club
Sportspeople from Lisbon District
UEFA Women's Euro 2022 players
S.C. Braga (women's football) players
UEFA Women's Euro 2017 players